History of Psychology is a peer-reviewed academic journal published by the Society for the History of Psychology (Division 26 of the American Psychological Association). The journal was established in 1998 and covers research on the history of psychology. The current Outgoing Editor is Nadine Weidman (Harvard University and Boston College). The Incoming Editor is Christopher D. Green (York University).

Abstracting and indexing 
The journal is abstracted and indexed in MEDLINE/PubMed and the Social Sciences Citation Index. According to the Journal Citation Reports, the journal has a 2020 impact factor of 1.029.

Notable articles 
The three most-cited articles published in the journal are:

References

External links 
 

American Psychological Association academic journals
English-language journals
History of psychology journals
Publications established in 1998
Quarterly journals